My Beloved is a 2012 Philippine television drama romance fantasy series.

My Beloved may also refer to:

"My Beloved", a song by Kari Jobe from the 2009 album Kari Jobe
"My Beloved", a song by Crowder from the 2014 album Neon Steeple
My Beloved (album), a 2014 album by Ahmad Hussain
My Beloved (film), a 1958 Soviet romance drama film
妈妈再爱我一次 (My Beloved), a 1988 Taiwanese drama film